Morris Ruskin is an American independent film producer and founder and chairman of Shoreline Entertainment, an international sales agency. He is also the co-founder of MoJo Global Arts, a production and management company.

Biography
Ruskin was born in South Africa to anti-Apartheid parents. At the age of 9, his family moved to Boston where his father went to Harvard Business School; at the age of 12, his family moved to Bermuda; and at the age of 15 they moved to Los Angeles where his mother attended and obtained a Ph.D. at UCLA School of Theater. She did her dissertation on South African playwright Athol Fugard and when Morris produced an adaptation of Fugard's "Master Harold"...and the Boys, he dedicated the movie to his mother.

Since the early 1990s, Ruskin has produced a number of critically acclaimed films including Glengarry Glen Ross, The Man From Elysian Fields, Lakeboat, Price of Glory, Marilyn Hotchkiss' Ballroom Dancing and Charm School, The Visit and Ladies in Black.

In 1992 Morris established Shoreline Entertainment to continue producing his own films and to help secure financing and distribution for other independent productions, structuring deals that incorporate deferments, soft money, and international co-productions in order to create financially viable motion pictures. Through Shoreline, Morris has brought multiple, award-winning Latin films to the market, such as La Nana, 7 cajas, Zona Sur, Contracorriente, Todos Tus Muertos, Father's Chair, just to name a few.

Morris has produced over sixty films, with his most recent being Ladies in Black which was directed by Bruce Beresford and released worldwide by Sony Pictures. Three of his films have premiered at the Sundance Film Festival; six have premiered at the Toronto International Film Festival; he has produced the opening night selection of the Slamdance Film Festival, and High Life was his first production to premiere at the Berlin International Film Festival.  Morris' films have been frequently feted as well: Al Pacino was nominated for an Academy Award for Best Actor in a Supporting Role for his performance in Glengarry Glen Ross; The Visit was nominated for four Independent Spirit Awards and The Signal played at the 2007 Sundance Film Festival and was nominated for the Independent Spirit John Cassavetes Award.

Personal life
Ruskin is married to Karna Ruskin, who is the highly esteemed fashion designer for Emerald Sundae. His sister, Susan Ruskin, is the Dean and Executive VP of AFI Conservatory.

Partial filmography
Glengarry Glen Ross
Price of Glory
Lakeboat
The Visit
The Man from Elysian Fields
Dark Corners
Marilyn Hotchkiss' Ballroom Dancing and Charm School
Everything's Gone Green
Weirdsville
The Signal
The Fifth Patient
Ladies in Black
Hank and Mike
Senseless
High Life
Master Harold...and the Boys
Pablo
A Farewell to Fools
Bloody Good Time
Alex & Eve
Melocotones
Boar

Press
South African Oscar submission ‘Knuckle City’ finds US home (exclusive)
The Independent Filmmaker's Guide to the New Hollywood: Success in the Era of Netflix and Streaming Video (Foreword)
The Independent Filmmaker's Guide to Writing a Business Plan for Investors, 2d ed. (Foreword)
MoJo Global Arts, 2btube, Touche, Strike Strategic Alliance
Shoreline Entertainment Launches Latino Division
Shoreline Becomes Latin American Talent & Literary Manager
Shoreline Entertainment: A Discussion with Founder and Head Morris Ruskin

References

External links

American film producers
American film studio executives
Living people
1954 births